Losharik is a 1971 Soviet animated film.

Losharik tells the story of a circus animal composed of brightly coloured juggling balls, created as a juggler wishes that he was a lion tamer. The name of the character, and thus the title of the film, is a  portmanteau of the Russian words for horse, "loshad" and small ball, "sharik" . Though friendly, Losharik is dismissed by the other circus animals for not being real. Dejected, Losharik gives away the balls that make up his form to children. When the children attend the circus, they demand the return of Losharik, giving back the balls which reform Losharik. The film was a favourite of both adults and children, though Ufimtsev claimed to be disappointed that he could not "fully realize his plan". For the production, art director Tamara Poletika and animator Yuri Norstein visited circus rehearsals for inspiration. The finished film, released by Soyuzmultfilm in 1971, has since been analysed for its themes, particularly in the context of Soviet culture. Two children's books have appeared using the character of Losharik, and the name became a nickname for a submarine of the Russian Navy which, like the animated character, used connected spheres in its construction.

Plot
A juggler in a circus dreams of one day becoming a lion tamer. As he juggles, the wooden juggling balls come together to form a live three-legged horse-like creature, which introduces itself as "Losharik", a portmanteau of the Russian words for horse, "loshad" and small ball, "sharik". The good-natured animal plays with the juggler. Seeing this, the ringmaster offers the juggler a chance to appear as a lion tamer, with the circus's lion and tiger. When the lion and tiger see Losharik, they dismiss him as not being a real animal. The disheartened Losharik leaves the circus and disassembles itself, giving the balls that make up its form to children.

The juggler, now the circus's lion tamer, appears in the ring and performs the routine with the lion and tiger. The children in the audience start to call for Losharik. Confused, the circus staff point out that Losharik is not a real animal, but the children cry that Losharik is kind, and therefore the most real of all. The lion and tiger leave, and the children throw the balls they had received into the ring, reassembling Losharik. Losharik and the juggler reunite, to the delight of the audience.

Production

Losharik was an early collaboration with illustrator Tamara Poletika, with whom he worked on a number of films between 1971 and 1976. The choice of subject involving toys and games was a common theme of Soviet children's animation, and its mainstay between the 1950s and 1980s. Earlier examples involving toys imbued with their own life included  1950 film , and Leonid Amalrik and  1953 film .

For accuracy in the depiction of circus life, Poletika and Norstein visited a circus and observed its rehearsals. Poletika would later recall that she asked in the studio if anyone wanted to attend them with her, and only Norstein agreed to. Details such as the acrobat's routine, and the stage curtains in the circus, would be used in the animated film. According to Poletika, the suggestion for Losharik having three legs rather than four came from the prominent art director Lev Milchin, and that the Tretyakov Gallery in Moscow had asked for two of the film's preliminary sketches. Despite being popular with both children and adults, and described as "a poignant story about a dream, striving for perfection, and betrayal" Ufimtsev "claimed that he could not fully realize his plan, and the result upset him."

Themes
Cultural historian David MacFadyen observes that the film addresses a number of themes prominent in Soviet society. The formation of Losharik from the individual wooden juggling balls represents the coming together of small parts into a 'social' whole. This harmonious creation is disrupted by the criticism of the lion and tiger in the film, resulting in Losharik's dissolution. The creature is restored when the children, acknowledging its kindness and sacrifice, express their demands for its return. Losharik is formed, disassembled, and reformed "by literal surrender to the world's social emotions." The film emphasises "affective variety and multiplicity", making use of crosscuts to "show fragmented events or a diversity of characters". The juggler's dreams of being a lion tamer are depicted with two dimensional cutouts, differentiating it from the 'real world', depicted with three dimensional puppets. Camera angles are used to demonstrate different points of view, such as a low angle as when the juggler is shown "finally understanding his animal's increasingly humble sense of reality."  The lion and tiger in the film are expressions of a "dogmatic body moulding the world", contrasting with Losharik, an "ideologically open, shifting body".

Legacy
Genrikh Sapgir, co-author of the screenplay, wrote a poem, also called "Losharik", published in 1974. It tells a similar story of a circus animal made up of coloured juggling balls. The character also appeared in Gennady Tsyferov's children's book Losharik and Other Fairy Tales, published in 2014. The creation of the name Losharik as a portmanteau appeared in a similar form with the 2003 animated series Smeshariki, released in English as Kikoriki. This combined the Russian word smeshnye, meaning "funny", with shariki, as with Losharik, meaning small balls. This referred to the design of the characters, which depicted animals as rounded balls. Losharik became the nickname of the Project 210 submarine built by Sevmash between 1988 and 2003, the name referring to the unique design of its pressure hull, consisting of seven interconnected spheres.

References

External links 

Losharik at Animator.ru

1971 animated films
1971 films
Soyuzmultfilm
Soviet animated short films
Animated films about horses